Miguel Aguilera (1895-1973) was a Colombian linguist. He was a founding member of the Instituto Colombiano de Cultura Hispánica, and is noted for critical works such as América en los Clásicos Españoles and Raíces lejanas de la Independencia.

References

1895 births
1973 deaths
Colombian non-fiction writers
20th-century non-fiction writers